In probability and statistics, the generalized K-distribution is a three-parameter family of continuous probability distributions. 
The distribution arises by compounding two gamma distributions. In each case, a re-parametrization of the usual form of the family of gamma distributions is used, such that the parameters are:
 the mean of the distribution,
 the usual shape parameter.

K-distribution is a special case of variance-gamma distribution, which in turn is a special case of generalised hyperbolic distribution. A simpler special case of the generalized K-distribution is often referred as the K-distribution.

Density
Suppose that a random variable  has gamma distribution with mean  and shape parameter , with  being treated as a random variable having another gamma distribution, this time with mean  and shape parameter . The result is that  has the following probability density function (pdf) for :

where  is a modified Bessel function of the second kind. Note that for the modified Bessel function of the second kind, we have . In this derivation, the K-distribution is a compound probability distribution. It is also a product distribution: it is the distribution of the product of two independent random variables, one having a gamma distribution with mean 1 and shape parameter , the second having a gamma distribution with mean  and shape parameter .

A simpler two parameter formalization of the K-distribution can be obtained by setting  as

This two parameter formalization is often referred to as the K-distribution, while the three parameter formalization is referred to as the generalized K-distribution.

This distribution derives from a paper by Eric Jakeman and Peter Pusey (1978) who used it to model microwave sea echo. Jakeman and Tough (1987) derived the distribution from a biased random walk model. Ward (1981) derived the distribution from the product for two random variables, z = a y, where a  has a chi distribution and y a complex Gaussian distribution. The modulus of z, |z|, then has K-distribution.

Moments
The moment generating function is given by

The n-th moments of K-distribution is given by

So the mean and variance are given by

Other properties

Applications
K-distribution arises as the consequence of a statistical or probabilistic model used in synthetic-aperture radar (SAR) imagery. The K-distribution is formed by compounding two separate probability distributions, one representing the radar cross-section, and the other representing speckle that is a characteristic of coherent imaging. It is also used in wireless communication to model composite fast fading and shadowing effects.

Notes

Sources

Further reading
 
 Ward, K. D.; Tough, Robert J. A; Watts, Simon (2006) Sea Clutter: Scattering, the K Distribution and Radar Performance, Institution of Engineering and Technology. .

Radar signal processing
Continuous distributions
Compound probability distributions
Synthetic aperture radar